The Poqomchiʼ are a Maya people in Guatemala. Their indigenous language is also called Poqomchiʼ, and is related to the Quichean–Poqom branch. Poqomchí is spoken in Baja Verapaz (Purulhá) and in Alta Verapaz: Santa Cruz Verapaz, San Cristóbal Verapaz, Tactic, Tamahú and Tucurú. It is also spoken in Chicamán (El Quiché).

Notes

Indigenous peoples in Guatemala
Maya peoples
Mesoamerican cultures